Francesca da Rimini, Op. 4, is an opera in four acts, composed by Riccardo Zandonai, with a libretto by , after D'Annunzio's play Francesca da Rimini. It was premiered at the Teatro Regio in Turin on 19 February 1914 and is still staged occasionally.

This opera is Zandonai's best-known work. In the New Grove Dictionary of Opera, Renato Chiesa calls it "one of the most original and polished Italian melodramas of the 20th century, [which] combines a powerful gift for Italian melody ... with an exceptional command of orchestration." Celebrated performers of the title role have included Gilda dalla Rizza, Magda Olivero (who recorded excerpts from the opera in 1969, for Decca Records),  Raina Kabaivanska and Renata Scotto.

Roles

Synopsis
The story takes place in Ravenna and Rimini.

Francesca, daughter of Guido I da Polenta, for state reasons, is to be married to Giovanni, known as Gianciotto, the malformed son of Malatesta da Verucchio. But as Francesca would certainly refuse to marry the lame and deformed Gianciotto, she is introduced in the first act, by means of a well-laid plot, to his handsome younger brother, Paolo, known as Il bello. Under the impression that Paolo is her destined bridegroom, Francesca falls deeply in love with him at first sight; he also falls passionately in love with her, although they do not exchange a single word.

The next act takes place on the platform of a tower of the Malatesti, while a battle rages between the Guelphs and Ghibellines. Francesca, now married to Gianciotto, meets Paolo and reproaches him for the fraud practised on her. He begs forgiveness and reveals his intense passion for her. Gianciotto brings the news of Paolo's election as Captain of the People and Commune of Florence. Paolo departs for Florence.

In the third act Francesca, in her luxurious apartment, is reading the story of Lancelot and Guinevere to her women. They then dance and sing in celebration of the advent of Spring, until, on a whispered word from her slave, Francesca dismisses them. Paolo, sick with longing for her, has returned from Florence. He enters; they continue reading the story of Guinevere together, until, no longer in control of their feelings, they let their lips meet in a long kiss.

In the fourth act, Malatestino, Gianciotto's youngest brother, who himself lusts for Francesca, has discovered her secret meetings with Paolo. After Francesca refuses to give in to his sexual advances, Malatestino betrays Francesca and Paolo to Gianciotto, who determines to find out the truth for himself. Accordingly, Gianciotto lies in wait outside Francesca's door, and surprising her and Paolo together at early dawn, he slays them both.

Selected recordings

References

Further reading
 Modern Music and Musicians, vol. 1. The University Society, New York. (1918)
 The New Grove Dictionary of Opera, ed. Stanley Sadie, 1992

External links
 
 Libretto

Italian-language operas
Operas by Riccardo Zandonai
Verismo operas
Operas
1914 operas
Operas set in Italy
Operas based on plays
Operas set in the 13th century
Operas based on real people
Cultural depictions of Francesca da Rimini
Operas based on works by Dante Alighieri
Operas based on works by Gabriele D'Annunzio
Works based on Inferno (Dante)